Sharp's Ridge is a steep ridge in Knoxville, Tennessee, north of the city's downtown. A  area of the  ridge is maintained as Sharp's Ridge Memorial Park, a city park dedicated to the honor of the area's war veterans. The ridge also is the site of a transmitting antenna farm that serves most of Knoxville's broadcasters.  The highest ground point on the ridge is an abandoned fire tower located at 1,391 feet (424 m) above mean sea level.  The ridge itself averages 200 to 300 feet (40 to 60 m) above the surrounding valley floor, allowing panoramic views of the Great Smoky Mountains and adjacent ranges to the east and the Cumberland Plateau and Cumberland Mountains to the west.

Sharp's Ridge is named for the Sharpe family, who lived on the ridge during the 19th century.

Geography

Sharp's Ridge (spelled "Sharp Ridge" on United States Geological Survey (USGS) topographical maps) is a narrow, elongate ridge characteristic of the Ridge-and-Valley Appalachians. It is held up by steeply dipping sandstones and siltstones of the Cambrian Rome Formation . The Saltville Fault is mapped along the northwest slope, and less resistant shales and limestones of the Cambrian Conasauga Group, also steeply dipping, underlie the valleys to the northwest and southeast. Beyond Love Creek, the ridge formation continues northeastward as McAnnally Ridge. The southern fringes of the Inskip and Fountain City suburbs, Christenberry Heights, and Beverly are located along the northern base of the ridge. The Lonsdale, Lincoln Park, and Whittle Springs neighborhoods of North Knoxville are located along the ridge's southern base.

First Creek and Second Creek, both southward-flowing tributaries of the Tennessee River, carve water gaps through Sharp's Ridge, effectively splitting the ridge into three sections.  The First Creek water gap is traversed by Broadway (part of U.S. Route 441), and the Second Creek water gap is traversed by I-275.  Interstate 640 runs parallel to the northern base of the ridge.  The ridge's middle section, between the First Creek and Second Creek gaps, is the highest and most prominent section, and is the location of Sharp's Ridge Memorial Park and the antenna farm.

Sharp's Ridge Memorial Park

Sharp's Ridge Memorial Park consists of  along the ridge crest and southern face of the center of Sharp's Ridge.  The park is accessible by Sharp's Ridge Road, just off Broadway.  The park's location on a prominent ridgetop oriented parallel to the flight path of migrating birds makes it a top birdwatching destination in springtime. It is used by the Knoxville chapter of the Tennessee Ornithological Society for birdwatching activities.  The park also has picnic facilities and several short walking trails.

Visible from Sharp's Ridge on clear days to the south is an excellent panorama of the Great Smoky Mountains-State Line Ridge, then further northeast up the High Unaka Mountains (namely the Bald Mountains) with Camp Creek Bald in Greene County, Tennessee being the northernmost visible peak, to the Southern Unaka Mountains (namely the Unicoi Mountains) with Starr Mountain near Etowah, Tennessee the southernmost visible peak. These faraway peaks are verifiable through the location of Tennessee Valley Authority (TVA) microwave dishes, which are aimed at relay towers on those faraway peaks.  Most of the Tennessee side of the state line ridge is part of the Cherokee National Forest, the exception being the Great Smokies, which are part of the Great Smoky Mountains National Park.

To the north of Sharp's Ridge on clear days is another excellent panorama, this one of the Cumberland Escarpment, the edge of the Cumberland Plateau that stretches from Sand Mountain in Alabama northeastward into Kentucky.  Local peaks clearly visible from Sharp's Ridge include Hinch Mountain near Crossville to the Southwest, Frozen Head above Petros, Flag Pole Mountain (part of Cross Mountain) above Rocky Top, northward to Point Peak above Cumberland Gap.  AT&T microwave dishes aimed at those peaks verify their locations from Sharp's Ridge.

Communications hub

Sharp's Ridge is the transmitting antenna farm for eleven of Knoxville's twelve analog and digital television stations, all of which broadcast from very noticeable towers in an antenna farm along the ridge.

The tallest tower is licensed by the Federal Communications Commission (FCC) as "Spectracite Tower Knoxville," built by Spectracite Towers, Inc.  The structure is owned by American Tower, which leases it to WUOT-FM 91.9. PSIP Channel 6, whose "batwing" antenna is at the top (the station operates WATE-DT digital Channel 26 also on this tower).  Also located on this tower is WTNZ PSIP Channel 43 and WBIR-DT, PSIP Channel 10, with their antennas both broadcasting from the top. This tower is located on the "Richland Towers Tower Lonsdale" site.

The second tallest tower is FCC-licensed as "Richland Towers Tower Lonsdale." It is owned by Richland Towers, Incorporated, which leases it to WVLT-TV PSIP Channel 8, (which operates WVLT-DT on digital Channel 30), and WKOP-TV PSIP Channel 15 (which operates its WKOP-DT digital Channel 17), whose antennas all broadcast from the candelabra array at the top. The "Lonsdale" reference in the license, refers to the Knoxville neighborhood in the valley just below the tower.

It is owned by the Gannett Pacific Corporation, licensee of WBIR-TV, which right now, does not broadcast from it. Its former analog Channel 10 antenna is on top of the tower, but its digital TV signal broadcasts from the "Spectracite Tower Knoxville" site.

It was located within 50 feet of the "Spectracite Tower Knoxville," virtually standing beside it. This tower with its identifiable "batwing" antenna at the top was the second tower that WATE-TV, Channel 6 formerly broadcast its analog signal from. This structure has been dismantled.

On that tower is also the antenna for WKNX-TV PSIP, Channel 7. This is also the tower that WTVK-TV, Channel 26 formerly broadcast its analog signal from (that station is now WVLT-TV, PSIP Channel 8). WVLT-TV also broadcast from this tower for a time, after switching to VHF analog Channel 8.

A much smaller  self-supporting broadcasting tower is also located beside the "Gannett Pacific Tower Knoxville." That is the tower that WBIR-TV formerly broadcast its analog signal from, also with a "batwing" array on its antenna at the top.  At one time, this tower, another 800-foot (240 m) tower owned by WATE-TV, and the  WTVK tower were the only ones on the ridge.

The Sharp's Ridge antenna farm is also the transmitting location for Class C FM radio station, WJXB-FM 97.5, whose antenna is located on the South Central Communications tower.  One Class A FM radio station, WKHT-FM 104.5, one Class D FM station W244AT at 96.7 and another Class D FM station W275AD at 102.9 all broadcast from the "Spectracite Tower Knoxville" site.

Various other entities, including city, county, and state government agencies, and cellular telephone companies, also transmit base-to-mobile communications from towers on Sharp's Ridge far shorter than the ones listed above.

"Antenna Farms"

The Sharp's Ridge collection of broadcast towers, commonly referred to as an "antenna farm" is a good example of radio and TV stations, co-locating their broadcast towers near each other on the highest point near their FCC city of license.  The nearest "antenna farms"  to Sharp's Ridge are on Holston Mountain in upper East Tennessee, home to most of the FM and TV stations in the Tri-Cities (Bristol, Virginia-Kingsport, Tennessee-Johnson City, Tennessee) Designated Market Area (DMA), and the Signal Mountain broadcast antenna farm, near Chattanooga, Tennessee, home to most of the FM and TV station antennas in that DMA.  Although most radio and TV stations are in fierce competition with each other in their broadcast markets, they will often locate their broadcasting antennas very near each other, and in some cases, will even share land or towers with each other, in the interests of space, land availability, and the cost of putting a transmission building on top of a mountain.  Other examples of co-located towers on mountain peaks in the United States are on Poor Mountain near Roanoke, Virginia;  Red Mountain in Birmingham, Alabama; Mount Wilson near Los Angeles; Sutro Tower in San Francisco; Lookout Mountain, Colorado near Denver; Cedar Hill between Dallas and Fort Worth; South Mountain Park near Phoenix; Nelson Peak near Salt Lake City;  Sandia Crest near Albuquerque, New Mexico; and probably the most famous broadcast antenna farm of all:  The World Trade Center Tower One, on which all of the New York City television and FM stations had their antennas.  All were lost when Twin Towers One and Two collapsed after the September 11 attacks in 2001.  The stations on the former World Trade Center Tower One were forced to go back to their old home, the 200-foot lower Empire State Building.  When the new Freedom Tower was built, all radio and television transmitting facilities moved to the top of that building, where they are today.

See also
 Bays Mountain
 Clinch Mountain
 Holston Mountain
 House Mountain
 Powell Mountain

References

Ridges of Tennessee
Geography of Knoxville, Tennessee
Parks in Tennessee
Tourist attractions in Knoxville, Tennessee
Protected areas of Knox County, Tennessee
Landforms of Knox County, Tennessee